Johannes Jacobus “John” de Jong (born 8 March 1977) is a Dutch retired professional footballer who played as an attacking midfielder.

Best known for his lengthy spell with PSV, he had good passing abilities, also having his career cut short by injury, retiring at 30. He amassed Eredivisie totals of 189 games and 43 goals, over the course of ten seasons.

Club career
Born in The Hague (Den Haag), de Jong started his professional career with his hometown club ADO Den Haag, in the second division. In January 1998, his solid performances led to a move to the Eredivisie with FC Utrecht, where he continued to perform well.

For 2000–01, de Jong joined PSV Eindhoven. After a good run in his debut campaign (28 matches, three goals, national league conquered) and the second, he was loaned to SC Heerenveen for one season.
 
On 26 February 2008, after having only played 15 games in four years, all in 2004–05, de Jong retired from football due to an injury he sustained in training in 2005. He was unable to recover even after 35 months of rehabilitation, and subsequently expressed interest in staying at PSV in a non-footballing capacity.

Honours
PSV
Eredivisie: 2000–01
KNVB Cup: 2004–05
Johan Cruyff Shield: 2000, 2001, 2003

References

External links
Stats at Voetbal International 
Beijen profile 

1977 births
Living people
Footballers from The Hague
Dutch footballers
Association football midfielders
Eredivisie players
Eerste Divisie players
ADO Den Haag players
FC Utrecht players
PSV Eindhoven players
SC Heerenveen players
Netherlands under-21 international footballers